The 2021 Lamar Lady Cardinals softball team represented Lamar University during the 2021 NCAA Division I softball season. The Lady Cardinals played their home games at Lamar Softball Complex and were led by third-year head coach Amy Hooks. They were members of the Southland Conference.  Home game attendance for the 2021 season was limited to 119 per game due to COVID19 precautions.

Preseason

Southland Conference Coaches Poll
The Southland Conference Coaches Poll was released on February 5, 2021. Lamar was picked to finish eighth in the Southland Conference with 86 votes.

Preseason All-Southland team
No player from Lamar was chosen to the All-Southland Team

National Softball Signing Day

Roster

Coaching staff

Schedule and results

Schedule Source:
*Rankings are based on the team's current ranking in the NFCA/USA Softball poll.

References

Lamar
Lamar Lady Cardinals softball
Lamar Lady Cardinals softball